Arthur Holden was an English footballer who played as a midfielder for Southend United before joining Plymouth Argyle in 1907. After changing teams, two productive years followed. Holden scored ten goals in 83 Southern League and Western League matches. He joined Chelsea in the summer of 1909, but only stayed there for one season. He scored one goal in 20 league appearances before returning to Plymouth Argyle, who were then managed by Bob Jack. Holden appeared another 44 times in league football for the club and scored four goals before returning to Southend United during the 1911–12 season.

References

Year of birth unknown
English footballers
Association football midfielders
Southend United F.C. players
Plymouth Argyle F.C. players
Chelsea F.C. players
Southern Football League players
English Football League players
Year of death unknown